Ifeanyi "Iffy" Tafari Decosta Allen (born 15 March 1994) is an English professional footballer who plays as a winger for Carshalton Athletic.

Career
Allen began his career at Fulham as a 14 year old, where he spent a year in the youth team before being released due to his size. He also had a trial with Reading, and then joined Barnet in the summer of 2010, signing a two-year scholarship. He made his debut as a 73rd-minute substitute for Curtis Weston in an FA Cup first round tie at home to Oxford United on 3 November 2012. In January 2013, Allen signed a "long term" professional contract with the Bees. He joined Kingstonian on loan on 10 January 2014. On 19 February, he joined Redhill on loan. Allen scored his first goal for Barnet in a 3–3 draw at Lincoln City on the final day of the 2013–14 season. He joined Wingate & Finchley on a three-month loan on 23 October 2014.

On 28 July 2015, Allen following his release from Barnet signed for League Two side Yeovil Town on a one-year deal.

On 1 February 2016, he signed for Torquay United from Yeovil until the end of the season.

On 22 July 2016, after his release from Torquay, Allen signed for Aldershot Town following a successful trial.

On 21 December 2016, he was released from Aldershot Town by manager Gary Waddock.

On 8 March 2017, he joined Wrexham after a successful spell on trial at the club. However, he was released by the club two months later at the end of the season.

Following his departure from Wrexham at the end of the season, Allen signed for Bromley, who he had impressed against for the Dragons just a month earlier. He signed a one-month loan deal with Wealdstone on 15 January 2018. He was released by Bromley at the end of the season.

Allen joined Dulwich Hamlet in September 2018. He was released two months later. Manager Gavin Rose said "For me he hadn't played to his potential – he had been in the Football League. Iffy has got good ability but for some reason he just didn't settle – it happens. He has shown glimpses in games and if he had done that a little more often he would be a regular in the team. He just found it very difficult to get going. He is a good lad who worked really hard. I hope he finds somewhere he can really kick on."

Allen joined Braintree Town on 18 January 2019. He then joined Maidstone United for the 2019–20 season. and then played for Ebbsfleet United in the curtailed 2020-21 season. He joined Lewes in August 2021.
In February 2022, Allen joined National League South side Hampton & Richmond Borough. He then joined Carshalton Athletic in August 2022.

References

External links

1994 births
Living people
Association football midfielders
English footballers
Barnet F.C. players
Kingstonian F.C. players
Redhill F.C. players
Wingate & Finchley F.C. players
Yeovil Town F.C. players
Torquay United F.C. players
Aldershot Town F.C. players
Wrexham A.F.C. players
Bromley F.C. players
Wealdstone F.C. players
Dulwich Hamlet F.C. players
Braintree Town F.C. players
Maidstone United F.C. players
Ebbsfleet United F.C. players
Lewes F.C. players
Hampton & Richmond Borough F.C. players
Carshalton Athletic F.C. players
English Football League players
National League (English football) players
Isthmian League players
Footballers from Lambeth